William John Postlethwaite (born 1989) is an English actor.

He is the son of actor Pete Postlethwaite, and grew up in Shropshire. He began training in acting at the London Academy of Music and Dramatic Art in 2008 and graduated in 2011. That same year, he made his stage debut as Grigory in the John Hodge play Collaborators.

In 2017, Postlethwaite appeared in the Game of Thrones episode "Dragonstone", alongside singer Ed Sheeran in a scene that received critical and fan backlash for Sheeran's cameo. In 2018, he had a role in Tomb Raider, a film adaptation of the video game franchise. He starred as Boris Stolyarchuk in the HBO miniseries Chernobyl and had a small role in Sam Mendes' war drama 1917. In 2021, Postlethwaite joined the cast of Beforeigners for its second season.

The actor took up the titular role in Macbeth, in addition to the role of Lysander in A Midsummer Night's Dream for the Watermill Theatre. His performance as Macbeth received positive reviews by Judi Herman, writing for WhatsOnStage.com. Macbeth had previously been portrayed by Postlethwaite's father, in 1997.

Filmography

Film

Television

References

External links
 

1989 births
Living people
21st-century English male actors
Actors from Shropshire
Alumni of the London Academy of Music and Dramatic Art
English male film actors
English male television actors